The Ann River is a  tributary of the Snake River of Minnesota, United States. It begins at the outlet of Ann Lake and flows generally southeast, reaching the Snake River south of Mora.

Ann River was named for an Ojibwe Indian woman who lived in the area.

See also
List of rivers of Minnesota

References

Minnesota Watersheds
USGS Hydrologic Unit Map - State of Minnesota (1974)

Rivers of Minnesota
Rivers of Kanabec County, Minnesota